Zoran Jovanović may refer to:

 Zoran Jovanović (basketball) (born 1965), Yugoslavian basketball player, see Yugoslavia national basketball team
 Zoran Jovanović (chess player) (born 1979), Croatian chess player, see List of chess grandmasters
 Zoran Jovanović (footballer) (born 1986), Swedish footballer
 Zoran Jovanović (politician), member of the House of Peoples of the Federation of Bosnia and Herzegovina
 Zoran Jovanović, silver medallist at the 1973 European Amateur Boxing Championships